Mesosa inaequalipennis is a species of beetle in the family Cerambycidae. It was described by Maurice Pic in 1944. It was first described in Vietnam.

References

inaequalipennis
Beetles described in 1944